Kona or KONA may refer to:

People
Kona (surname)
Dilshad Nahar Kona, Bangladeshi singer also known as Kona

Television
 Kona (TV series), a Kenyan telenovela that premiered in 2013

Locations
 Kona, Kentucky
 Kona, North Carolina
 Kona District, Hawaii, on the western coast of the island of Hawaii. Kona means "Leeward" in Hawaiian. In Ancient Hawaii each island had a "Kona" district.
 Kailua-Kona, Hawaii, sometimes called Kona Town
 Kona Department, a department in Mouhoun Province, Burkina Faso
 Alternative spelling of Konah, a town in Guinea
 Colossae or Kona, an ancient city of Phrygia
Kona, a city of Howrah district in West Bengal, India
 Kona, Ashanti, a small town in the Sekyere South District, Ghana

Radio stations
 KONA (AM), a radio station in Kennewick, Washington
 KONA-FM, a radio station in Kennewick, Washington
 KONA-LP, a low-power radio station (100.5 FM) licensed to serve Kailua-Kona, Hawaii, United States

Electronic devices
 Kyocera Kona, a flip phone manufactured by Kyocera

Music
 Kona (lit. woman in Icelandic) a 1985 solo album by Icelandic singer Bubbi
 "Kona", 2018 single from the album Limpopo Champions League by South African musician Sho Madjozi

Military
 Signal Intelligence Regiment (KONA), German Signal intelligence regiment (abbr. KONA), during World War II

Other
 Hyundai Kona
 Kona Brewing Company
 Kona coffee, a product of the Kona District in Hawaii
 Kona, Monarch of Monster Isle, a 1960s comic book character
 Kona storm, a weather event in Hawaii
 Winona Municipal Airport's ICAO identifier
 Kona Town, an album by the band Pepper
 Kona Grill, a restaurant chain based in Scottsdale, Arizona
 An open-source implementation of the K programming language
 Kona (video game), a video game developed by Parabole
 Kona Bicycle Company
 Kona International Airport in Kailua-Kona, Hawaii

See also
 Cona (disambiguation)
 Ironman World Championship, a triathlon held in the Kona District of Hawaii
 Konna, a town in Mali